John Leavy Fryer (23 September 1911) was an English footballer who played for Wrexham, Hull City and Nottingham Forest in the Football League.

References

1911 births
Association football forwards
English Football League players
English footballers
Everton F.C. players
Footballers from Widnes
Hull City A.F.C. players
Nottingham Forest F.C. players
Runcorn F.C. Halton players
Wrexham A.F.C. players
Year of death missing